Ryan Sands is an American actor from Washington, D.C. He is known for his portrayal of Geoffrey Wilder in Marvel's Runaways.

Early life and education
Sands grew up in Washington D.C. along with several older brothers and sisters. His father served in the military and died when Ryan was twelve.

Career
While initially interested in other types of art, Ryan's decision to act started in college after seeing the movie Love Jones. He portrayed Officer Lloyd "Truck" Garrick on The Wire and has since made one-off appearances in shows such as Grimm, Castle, Scorpion, NCIS and Prison Break.

Sands was cast as Geoffrey Wilder in the Hulu adaptation of Marvel's Runaways.

Filmography

References

External links

Living people
African-American male actors
People from Washington, D.C.
Year of birth missing (living people)
American male actors
21st-century African-American people